The 1918 Brooklyn Robins finished the season in fifth place.

Offseason 
 January 9, 1918: Casey Stengel and George Cutshaw were traded by the Robins to the Pittsburgh Pirates for Chuck Ward, Burleigh Grimes and Al Mamaux.

Regular season

Season standings

Record vs. opponents

Notable transactions 
 July 15, 1918: George Smith was purchased by the Robins from the New York Giants.
 August 21, 1918: Jimmy Archer was purchased from the Robins by the Cincinnati Reds.
 October 1918: George Smith was purchased from the Robins by the New York Giants.

Roster

Player stats

Batting

Starters by position 
Note: Pos = Position; G = Games played; AB = At bats; H = Hits; Avg. = Batting average; HR = Home runs; RBI = Runs batted in

Other batters 
Note: G = Games played; AB = At bats; H = Hits; Avg. = Batting average; HR = Home runs; RBI = Runs batted in

Pitching

Starting pitchers 
Note: G = Games pitched; IP = Innings pitched; W = Wins; L = Losses; ERA = Earned run average; SO = Strikeouts

Other pitchers 
Note: G = Games pitched; IP = Innings pitched; W = Wins; L = Losses; ERA = Earned run average; SO = Strikeouts

Relief pitchers 
Note: G = Games pitched; W = Wins; L = Losses; SV = Saves; ERA = Earned run average; SO = Strikeouts

References

External links
Baseball-Reference season page
Baseball Almanac season page
Brooklyn Dodgers reference site
Acme Dodgers page 
Retrosheet
1918 Brooklyn Robins uniform

Los Angeles Dodgers seasons
Brooklyn Robins season
Brooklyn Robins
1910s in Brooklyn
Flatbush, Brooklyn